Roledumab is a monoclonal antibody. It binds to RHD, the Rhesus factor antigen.

It is currently at Phase III trials for Rh disease.

References 

Monoclonal antibodies